Maneige was a Canadian progressive rock and fusion jazz band from Quebec. The instrumental ensemble was one of the Quebec progressive rock scene's longest-running bands, performing regularly for several decades.

History
Maneige was founded in 1972 by Alain Bergeron and Jérôme Langlois.
Bergeron played flute and saxophone, while Langlois was a keyboardist. They were joined by the drummer Gilles Schetagne, percussionist Paul Picard and bassist Yves Leonard, to form the initial quintet. The band played a few concerts in the early 1970s, opening for the Dutch progressive band, Ekseption and for Soft Machine on the 15 February 1974 at CEGEP Maisonneuve. They released their first two albums on the Harvest label. Their eponymous debut release contained a side-long track and established their experimental approach. Jerome's brother, Vincent Langlois, was added as a second keyboardist and a wind player, and an array of percussion instruments, some tuned, were used. Guitarist Denis Lapierre had been added to the lineup. In 1975, Billboard described the band as "pop avant-garde", writing that "they mix musique concrete in a style between early Zappa and Pink Floyd", and noted that the album "brought success beyond exepectations". The band signed with Capitol Records in 1974; their second album, also released in 1975, was Les Porches.

After these two initial albums, Jerome Langlois left due to differences in opinion concerning the band's musical direction, and Vincent Langlois took over sole keyboard duties. Paul Picard, from the original lineup but absent from the first two releases, rejoined the band. The next two studio albums were more focused, with shorter compositions. Ni vent... ni nouvelle and Libre Service were the next two releases, and both were  reissued on CD in the early 1990s. The band toured in Canada, including a performance at the Winnipeg Heritage Festival in 1978.

A live album followed in 1979, entitled Composite. Two more albums came in the early 1980s, which were more of a jazz rock styling. In the late 1990s, Live Montreal 1974-1975 was issued featuring recordings from the early version of the band, including the side-long "Le Rafiot" from their first album, as well as the unreleased "1-2-3-4-5-6".

In 2005, ProgQuébec reissued some archive material, and issued the previously unreleased early composition "Manège".

Discography
1975: Maneige
1975: Les Porches, Capitol Records,  EMI Of Canada: ST 6438  
1977: Ni Vent...Ni Nouvelle
1978: Libre Service - Self Service
1979: Composite
1980: Montréal, 6 am
1981: Images
1998: Live Montréal 1974-1975
2005: Live à l’Évêché 1975
2005: Live
2006: Les Porches Live

References

Musical groups established in 1972
Musical groups disestablished in 1983
Musical groups from Montreal
Canadian progressive rock groups
1972 establishments in Quebec
1983 establishments in Quebec
Avant-pop musicians